Avitus was a Roman emperor. The term also may refer to:

 Avitus of Braga was an early fifth-century literary priest of Braga (Portugal)
 Alphius Avitus (flourished 1st century BC & 1st century), Latin poet
 Gaius Julius Avitus Alexianus, Syrian aristocrat (flourished 2nd century & 3rd century)
 Avitus Marinianus, Roman consul in 423
 Avitus of Vienne, Latin poet and bishop (494-517)
 Avitus (spider), a genus of jumping spiders
 A major character in the real-time strategy game Dawn of War II, set in the Warhammer 40,000 universe.

See also